State Board of Education may refer to:

India
 Jammu and Kashmir State Board of School Education
 Karnataka Secondary Education Examination Board
 Maharashtra State Board of Technical Education

United States
 Alabama State Board of Education
 California State Board of Education
 Colorado State Board of Education
 Connecticut State Board of Education
 Florida Board of Education
 Georgia State Board of Education
 Illinois State Board of Education
 Indiana State Board of Education
 Kansas State Department Board of Education
 Massachusetts Board of Education
 Michigan State Board of Education
 Missouri State Board of Education
 New Jersey State Board of Education
 North Carolina State Board of Education
 North Dakota State Board of Higher Education
 Ohio State Board of Education
 Oklahoma State Board of Education
 Oregon State Board of Education
 Texas State Board of Education
 Vermont State Board of Education
 Virginia State Board of Education
 Washington State Board of Education